USS Antietam was constructed during the final years of the American Civil War, but was not launched because the war was winding down in the Union's favor. She was eventually placed into service to be used as a storeship and as a barracks ship until she was disposed of in 1888.

Service history 
The first U.S. Navy ship to be so named, Antietam was a screw sloop of war laid down in 1864 at the Philadelphia Navy Yard, but was not finished by the end of the American Civil War. Instead, she remained on the stocks, about two-thirds complete, until 1869. At that time, it was decided to complete her as an equipment storeship, serving as such and as a floating barracks at League Island, Pennsylvania from 1876 to 1888. On 8 September 1888, Antietam was sold to Mr. C. H. Gregory of Thomaston, New York.

See also
List of sloops of war of the United States Navy

References

Ships of the Union Navy
Ships built in Philadelphia
Sloops of the United States Navy
Steamships of the United States Navy
United States Naval Academy
Training ships of the United States Navy
1869 ships
Stores ships of the United States Navy